EGIS-7625 is a selective and competitive 5-HT2B receptor antagonist. It is experimentally proven to be directly associated with smooth stomach muscle constriction of white rats in vivo, and variably effective in provoking a similar response in in vitro human stomach cells. In high blood concentrations, it causes mild constriction of rabbit pulmonary arteries.

References 

5-HT2 antagonists
Anilines
Piperazines